The Indian Pueblo Cultural Center, located in Albuquerque, is owned and operated by the 19 Indian Pueblos of New Mexico and dedicated to the preservation and perpetuation of Pueblo Indian Culture, History and Art. The Indian Pueblo Cultural Center is a non-profit that opened in August, 1976, to showcase the history and accomplishments of the Pueblo people, from Pre-Columbian to current time.

Mission statement and philosophy
"To preserve and perpetuate Pueblo culture and to advance understanding by presenting with dignity and respect, the accomplishments and evolving history of the Puebloan peoples of New Mexico."

Museum exhibitions
The center includes a  museum of the authentic history and artifacts of traditional Pueblo cultures and their contemporary art. To celebrate the 40th anniversary of the center, an exhibit titled "We are of This Place: The Pueblo Story" opened on April 2, 2016. The permanent exhibit highlights the creativity and adaptation which made possible the survival, diversity and achievements of each of the 19 Pueblos. The center also includes a small, changing exhibit that highlights the work of living traditional and contemporary artists. Traditional Indian dances and artist demonstrations are open to the public on Saturday and Sunday.

In 2022, the center featured an exhibition titled, Pivot, featuring painted skateboard decks created by younger Native artists. Also in 2022, the center received a $100,000 grant from the National Endowment for the Arts to fund new staff positions, and allow the institution to devote more of their resources to public programming.

References

External links 
 

Art museums and galleries in New Mexico
Museums in Albuquerque, New Mexico
Native American museums in New Mexico
Native Americans in Albuquerque, New Mexico